Pavel Fyodorovich Tchelitchew ( – 31 July 1957) was a Russian-born surrealist painter, set designer and costume designer.

Early life 
Tchelitchew was born to an aristocratic family of landowners and was educated by private tutors. Tchelitchew expressed an early interest in ballet and art. His family was forced to flee Russia after the Russian Revolution in 1917. He studied under Aleksandra Ekster at the Kiev Academy, and after graduation worked designing and building theater sets in Odessa and later Berlin from 1920-1923.

Career 
Tchelitchew moved to Paris in 1923 and became acquainted with Gertrude Stein and, through her, the Sitwell and Gorer families. His interest in creating multimedia experiences during this period that drew together painting, film, and dance, led to collaborations with ballet impresario Sergei Diaghilev (stage designer for Ode by Léonide Massine, 1928) and choreographer George Balanchine.  He and Edith Sitwell had a long-standing close friendship and they corresponded frequently. Tchelitchew painted six major portraits of Sitwell.

His first U.S. show was of his drawings, along with other artists, at the newly opened Museum of Modern Art in 1930. In 1934, he moved from Paris to New York City with his partner, writer Charles Henri Ford. In New York he continued to work with Balanchine and met his greatest champion and patron, Lincoln Kirstein. From 1940 to 1947, he provided illustrations for the Surrealist magazine View, edited by Ford and writer and film critic Parker Tyler.

His most significant work is the painting Hide and Seek, painted in 1940–42, and currently owned by the Museum of Modern Art in New York City.

Tchelitchew's early painting was abstract in style, described as Constructivist and Futurist and influenced by his study with Aleksandra Ekster. After emigrating to Paris he became associated with the Neo-romanticism movement. He continuously experimented with new styles, eventually incorporating multiple perspectives and elements of surrealism and fantasy into his painting. As a set and costume designer, he collaborated with Sergei Diaghilev and George Balanchine, among others.

Tchelitchew’s works can be found in the collections of the Art Institute of Chicago, the National Gallery of Art in Washington, D.C., the Courtauld Institute of Art in London, and the Philadelphia Museum of Art.

Among Tchelitchew's well-known paintings are portraits of Natalia Glasko, Edith Sitwell, and Gertrude Stein and the works Phenomena (1936–1938) and Cache Cache (Hide and Seek, 1940–1942). Tchelitchew designed sets for Ode (Paris, 1928), L'Errante (Paris, 1933), Nobilissima Visione (London, 1938) and Ondine (Paris, 1939). He was known for camouflaging bodies and faces into geometric lines or landscaped forms on artwork. He used abstractionism and symbolism to convey both the outer and inner appearance of the object.

Personal life 
Tchelitchew became a United States citizen in 1952, but lived mainly in Italy from 1949.

Tchelitchew was openly homosexual. He met the American pianist Allen Tanner in Berlin in the 1920s and the two men became lovers, moving to Paris together to pursue their artistic careers. In 1934, he left Tanner for the poet Charles Henri Ford. Ford and Tchelitchew had met shortly after Ford's arrival in Paris in 1933 to publish The Young and Evil.

Death 
Tchelitchew died in Grottaferrata, Italy in 1957. His long time partner, Charles Henri Ford, was by his bedside. Tchelitchew's body is interred in Père Lachaise Cemetery in Paris.

References

Further reading
Parker Tyler, The Divine Comedy of Pavel Tchelitchew: A Biography. (New York: Fleet, 1967)

External links
The Kinsey Institute: Biography and gallery of several paintings by Tchelitchew
GLBTQ bio
Tate Gallery biography
Artnet review of "Pavel Tchelitchew: Landscape of the Body" exhibition
MoMA Collection
A guide to the Pavel Tchelitchew Collection at the Beinecke Rare Book and Manuscript Library

1898 births
1957 deaths
People from Duminichsky District
People from Zhizdrinsky Uyezd
Chelishchev family
Russian male painters
Russian surrealist artists
Gay painters
Russian gay artists
Russian LGBT painters
20th-century Russian painters
20th-century Russian LGBT people
20th-century Russian male artists
White Russian emigrants to France
White Russian emigrants to the United States
White Russian emigrants to Italy